Hypselostoma insularum is a species of small air-breathing land snail, a terrestrial pulmonate gastropod mollusk in the family Vertiginidae, the vertigo snails.

Distribution 
The type locality is Yonaguni, Ryukyu Islands, Japan.

It is critically endangered and endangered species.

References

External links 
 http://bigai.world.coocan.jp/pic_book/data54/r005367.html

Vertiginidae